The Chilean mockingbird (Mimus thenca), locally known as tenca, is a species of bird in the family Mimidae. It primarily inhabits Chile's northern half, though there are sightings in Argentina.

Taxonomy and systematics

The Chilean mockingbird is monotypic.

Description

The male is somewhat larger than the female. Adults have a wide whitish supercilium . Their crown, neck, and back are brownish gray with darker streaks and their rump browner. The wings and tail are blackish. The wings show two narrow bars when folded. The outermost tail feathers have white edges and most of the others have white tips. The throat is whitish, the chest brownish gray, the belly dirty white, and the flanks buffy with blackish streaks. The juvenile is similar but more buffy below with more streaks.

Distribution and habitat

The Chilean mockingbird is found in Chile from Copiapó Province in the Atacama Region south to Los Lagos, Puerto Montt, and Chiloé Island. A small population also exists in Neuquén Province, Argentina.

The Chilean mockingbird inhabits a wide variety of biomes, most of which are characterized by scrub, shrubs, or widely spaced trees. Examples include succulent coastal scrub, inland savanna bushland, and evergreen Chilean matorral. It also occurs at the edges of low relict woodland patches such as those in Bosque de Fray Jorge National Park and in disturbed habitats, though only rarely in urban areas. It shuns Nothofagus and Cryptocarya woodlands in the south and plantations of introduced pines in central Chile.

Behavior

Feeding

The Chilean mockingbird forages mainly on the ground, turning over leaf litter and digging under fallen branches and around plant stems. It is omnivorous; it has been documented feeding on insects, wild and cultivated fruits, nectar, and a small lizard.

Breeding

The Chilean mockingbird nests mainly in October and November. They are territorial, probably throughout the year. Their nest is a cup made of twigs lined with moss or wool, placed low in vegetion such as cacti and thorny bushes. The clutch size is two to four. The nest is often parasitized by shiny cowbirds (Molothrus bonariensis).

Vocalization

The Chilean mockingbird sings year round, "a series of sweet, variable notes and phrases". It is an "excellent mimic of other bird species."

Status

The IUCN has assessed the Chilean mockingbird as being of Least Concern. Though it has a somewhat restricted range, it is common within it and there are no known threats to its population.

References

External links

Chilean mockingbird
Birds of Chile
Chilean mockingbird
Taxonomy articles created by Polbot